Electricity is a 1994 album by New Zealand pianist Peter Jefferies. It was released on the Ajax Records label. The album includes reworkings of previous Jefferies tracks "Wined Up" and "Crossover" (from a 1993 7" recorded with Stephen Kilroy).

It was reissued via Superior Viaduct in 2015.

Critical reception
Trouser Press wrote that "Jefferies concentrates on the more melodious (if somber) end of things for most of the record, an approach that crystallizes beautifully on an album-ending cover of Barbara Manning’s 'Scissors.'”

Track listing

Personnel 
Paul Cahill – guitar on "Crossover"
Shayne Carter – guitar on "Wined Up" and "Electricity", bass guitar on "Electricity"
John Harvey – sampler
Brendan Hoffman – production, engineering
Peter Jefferies – vocals, piano, keyboards, drums, guitar, bass guitar, cello, production, engineering
Robbie Muir – guitar on "Snare"
Bruce Russell – guitar on "Just Nothing"

References

External links 
 

1994 albums
Peter Jefferies albums